The Kano Emirate Council is a traditional state in Northern Nigeria with headquarters in the city of Kano, the capital of the modern Kano State. Preceded by the Emirate of Kano the council was formed in 1903 after the British pacification of the Sokoto Caliphate.

Ado Bayero became the emir in 1963, reigning for 50 years until his death in 2014; he oversaw the transformation of the Emirate under Nigeria's federal constitution that subjects Northern Nigeria's Emirates to political leaders. The emir of Kano serves as the leader of the Tijaniyya sufi order in Nigeria, historically the second most important Muslim position in Nigeria after the Sultan of Sokoto who is the leader of the more populous Qadiriyya sufi order in Nigeria.

History

In 1903, British forces captured Kano.

The 7th emir of Kano, who was in Sokoto when Kano was occupied, was captured and exiled to Lokoja where he died in 1926.

The British immediately made Kano an important administrative centre in Northern Nigeria.

The role of the Kano Emirate steadily grew in the new Northern Nigeria. In the 1940s administrative re-organisation restored the consultative status of the ancient Taran Kano or council of Nine, this receded the status of the Emir as the Sole Native Administrator and instead made him the head of a Native Authority.

Also in the 1940s Northern Nigerian agitation for independence from the South led to a national re-organisation that made Nigeria a Federation of Independent and autonomous regions. Kano became the fulcrum of a new Northern political class that emerged to fight against perceived southern influence.

In 1950 the Northern Elements Progressive Union emerged in Kano as the first political party in Northern Nigeria, it was swiftly followed by the emergence of the Northern People's Congress and other smaller political parties.

In 1963, allegations of fraud and misappropriation were laid against the Emir of Kano Sanusi Bayero. A panel headed by D M Muffet later found evidence of misappropriation and recommended the resignation of Sanusi. Immediately afterwards, Emir Sanusi abdicated and was replaced by his uncle Inuwa Abbas who reigned for only nine months before his death. The abdication of Sanusi led to agitation of Kanoan Independence and led to the emergence of the Kano People's Party.

Inuwa was succeeded by his nephew Ado Bayero who reigned for 50 years before his death on 6 June 2014.

Various administrative re-organisations in Bayero's reign saw a gradual weaning of the Emir's powers. Although the Emir has limited formal powers, he continues to exert considerable authority and provides leadership on issues such as the tension between Christians and Muslims in Northern Nigeria.

On 8 June 2014, former Nigerian central banker Muhammadu Sanusi II was selected to succeed Bayero as Emir of Kano.

In 2019 the emirate was split into five by the Kano state government, calving off Emirates of Bichi, Karaye, Gaya and Rano, in addition to the substantially reduced Kano Emirate.

Government

Under the British indirect administrative structure the Emir was the sole Native Authority subordinate to the supervision of the British Colonial Resident. Hakimai (Chiefs) assisted the Emir in the administration of the Emirate and under a re-organization by Dr. Cargill the Resident of Kano province the Hakimai were posted out of the capital to the Districts as District Heads.

The Cargill re-organization made each Hakimi to have a contiguous territory where he resided at the headquarters and administered on behalf of the Emir and the Jakadu were eliminated. The powerful slave officials were also not given any territories and their previous possessions were given to the free born Hakimai most of whom belonged to the Sullubawa ruling clan with one each from the Yolawa, Jobawa, Danbazawa, Sullubawan Tuta who became the Kingmakers that appoint the Emir.

Commerce

The British encouraged the production of commodities for export as raw materials for British industries. In Kano groundnut and cotton were encouraged. Kano Province became the largest producer of groundnut in Nigeria and by the 1960s during good harvest it was producing about half million tons of the commodity. The export of cotton was not as high as groundnut because the local textile craftsmen used it until later when their products became less competitive compared to imported items. The railway was a great facilitator of colonial economic transformation. It reached Kano in 1912 and it helped the province to maintain its economic edge over other provinces. Apart from the ease of transportation it also brought many migrant laborers and semi-skilled people from other parts of Nigeria and they formed the nucleus of Sabon Gari a new district created for them outside the city of Kano.

Emirs

Emirs during and after the colonial period:
Muhammad Abbass (ruled 1903–1919)
Usman II (ruled 1919–1926)
Abdullahi Bayero (ruled 1926–1953)
Muhammadu Sanusi (ruled 1954–1963)
Muhammad Inuwa (ruled 1963)
Ado Bayero (ruled 1963– 6 June 2014)
Muhammadu Sanusi II (8 June 2014 - 9 March 2020)
Aminu Ado Bayero (9 March 2020 – present)

See also

List of rulers of Kano

References

Kano
Kano, Emir of
Emir of Kano
Politics of Northern Nigeria
Nigerian traditional states